Václav Mottl (19 May 1914 – 16 June 1982) was a Czechoslovak sprint canoeist who competed in the late 1930s. He won a gold medal in the C-2 10000 m event at the 1936 Summer Olympics in Berlin.

Mottl also won a bronze medal in the C-2 1000 m event at the 1938 ICF Canoe Sprint World Championships in Vaxholm.

He was born and died in Prague.

References

Sports-reference.com profile

1914 births
1982 deaths
Canoeists at the 1936 Summer Olympics
Czech male canoeists
Czechoslovak male canoeists
Olympic canoeists of Czechoslovakia
Olympic gold medalists for Czechoslovakia
Olympic medalists in canoeing
ICF Canoe Sprint World Championships medalists in Canadian
Medalists at the 1936 Summer Olympics
Canoeists from Prague